Teddy Kristiansen (born 29 July 1964) is a Danish comic book artist, known for his work in mystery, horror, and dark, suspense-filled comics. He drew one chapter of "The Kindly Ones" story arc in Neil Gaiman's The Sandman series. In 2005, Kristiansen won an Eisner Award for Best Comics Painter for his work on the Superman Graphic Novel It's a Bird.... Kristiansen was also featured in DC's 8th issue of Solo.

Published works
Superman og Fredsbomben, Interpresse (Copenhagen, Denmark, 1990)
Superman in Europa, Baldakijn Boeken (Amsterdam/Bussum, Netherlands, 1990)
Supermann i Norge, Semic (Oslo, Norway, 1990)
Stålmannen i Stockholm, Carlsen Comics (Stockholm, Sweden, 1990)
Teräsmies: Supersankari Helsingissä!, Semic (Helsinki, Finland, 1990)
Superman y la Bomba de la Paz, Ediciones Zinco (Barcelona, Spain, 1991)
Superman e Il Pacificatore, Corto Maltese Magazine #102, Vol. 10 #3, Rizzoli Milano Libri Edizioni (Milan, Italy, March 1992)
Showcase '94, Vol. 1 #8-9, (DC Comics, 1994)
House of Secrets 1-25 (DC Comics: Vertigo, 1996–1998)
Sandman Midnight Theatre One-Shot Graphic Novel (DC Comics: Vertigo, 1995)
Batman Black and White #3 (DC Comics, 1996)
House of Secrets: Facade #1-2 (DC Comics: Vertigo, 2001)
The Dreaming 36-39 (DC Comics: Vertigo)
Superman: Metropolis #6-10 (DC Comics, 2003)
Superman: It's a Bird... (DC Comics, 2004)
Solo #8 (DC Comics, 2005)
Grendel Tales Four Devils, One Hell (Dark Horse Comics)
Genius, written by Steven T. Seagle (First Second)

Awards and nominations

 1989–1990, Tegneseriekonvents Award Winner — Best Colored Danish Cartoon: Superman og Fredsbomben (Interpresse)
 1993, Will Eisner Awards Nominee — Best Painter/Multimedia Artist: Tarzan: Love, Lies, and the Lost City (Malibu Comics)
 1994, Will Eisner Awards Nominee — Best Painter/Multimedia Artist: Grendel Tales: Four Devils, One Hell (Dark Horse Comics)
 1996, Will Eisner Awards Nominee — Best Painter/Multimedia Artist: Bacchus Color Special (Dark Horse)
 2005, Will Eisner Awards Winner — Best Painter/Multimedia Artist (Interior Art): Superman: It's a Bird... (Vertigo/DC)
 2013, Will Eisner Awards Nominee — Best Painter/Multimedia Artist: The Red Diary/The RE[a]D Diary (Man of Action/Image Comics)

References

External links

Teddy Kristiansen at Blogger

Biography on tegneseriemuseet.dk (scroll down for English text).

1964 births
Living people
Danish cartoonists
Danish comics artists
Eisner Award winners for Best Painter/Multimedia Artist (Interior)